Scrobipalpa nigripuncta is a moth in the family Gelechiidae. It was described by Oleksiy V. Bidzilya and Hou-Hun Li in 2010. It is found in Henan, China.

Adults are on wing in May.

Etymology
The species name refers to the wing pattern and is derived from the Latin prefix nigr- (meaning black) and Latin punctus (meaning small spot).

References

Scrobipalpa
Moths described in 2010